Carmenza Cardona Londoño aka La Chiqui (1953 – March/April, 1981) was a Colombian guerrilla fighter with the M-19.

Siege of the Dominican Embassy 

She participated in the 1980 Dominican Republic Embassy siege in Bogotá, as second in command, under the alias 'Norma'. She took part in early discussions with the Colombian Government along with one of the hostages, Mexican Ambassador Ricardo Galan.

Death
There are conflicting reports about Londoño's death. Some newspapers at the time list her as a POW handed over to the Colombian Army by Ecuadorian authorities in March, 1981, after clashes near the town of Mocoa. In which case she would have died as a prisoner of the Colombian Army. Other news sources say she was killed in combat against the Army in Colombia's pacific coast region of Chocó, in April of 1981.

References

1953 births
1981 deaths
Colombian guerrillas killed in action
19th of April Movement members
Women in war in Colombia
Women in warfare post-1945